Janey Lee Gohl (born August 18, 1956) is a beauty queen from St. Cloud, Minnesota who has competed in the Miss USA pageant.

Gohl was born to Roger and Bernice Bromenschenkel Gohl. She has three sisters, Diane, Sandra, and Sharon, and two brothers, Roger and John.

Gohl won the Miss Minnesota USA 1978 title in her first attempt and represented Minnesota at the Miss USA 1978 pageant in Charleston, South Carolina.

Gohl graduated from Cathedral High School in 1974 and attained a Bachelor of Arts degree in journalism from St. Cloud State University the same weekend she won her state title. In 1983, she earned a law degree from William Mitchell College of Law in St. Paul, Minnesota. In 2002, she added to her academic credentials a Master of Science in Organization Development (MSOD) from Pepperdine University's top-ranked MSOD program. She works in the Human Resources/Organization Development field.

References

External links
Miss Minnesota USA official website
Miss USA official website

St. Cloud State University

Living people
1956 births
Miss USA 1970s delegates
People from St. Cloud, Minnesota
William Mitchell College of Law alumni
Pepperdine University alumni
Human resource management people
20th-century American people